The Lasiopteridi  is a  supertribe of flies from the family Cecidomyiidae. They are often called gall midges or gall gnats.

Systematics
Lasiopteridi - tribes, and genera:

Brachineurini
Brachineura Rondani, 1840
Brachyneurina Mamaev, 1967
Mikiola Kieffer, 1912
Prolauthia Rübsaamen, 1915
Lasiopterini
Baldratia Kieffer, 1897
Hybolasioptera Rübsaamen, 1915
Lasioptera Fischer von Waldheim\nMeigen, 1818
Ozirhincus Rondani, 1840
Stefaniella Kieffer, 1898
Ledomyiini
Ledomyia Kieffer, 1895
Oligotrophini
Amerhapha Rübsaamen, 1914
Arceuthomyia Kieffer, 1913
Arnoldiola Strand, 1926
Bayeriola Gagné, 1991
Blastomyia Kieffer, 1913
Bremiola Rübsaamen, 1915
Craneiobia Kieffer, 1913
Cystiphora Kieffer, 1892
Dasineura Rondani, 1840
Didymomyia Rübsaamen, 1912
Fabomyia Fedotova, 1991
Geocrypta Kieffer, 1913
Gephyraulus Rübsaamen, 1915
Giraudiella Rübsaamen, 1915
Hartigiola Rübsaamen, 1912
Iteomyia Kieffer, 1913
Jaapiella Rübsaamen, 1915
Janetiella Kieffer, 1898
Kaltenbachiola Hedicke, 1938
Lathyromyza Rübsaamen, 1915
Macrolabis Kieffer, 1892
Mayetiola Kieffer, 1896
Mikomya Kieffer, 1912
Misospatha Kieffer, 1913
Neomikiella Hedicke, 1938
Oligotrophus Latreille, 1805
Pemphigocecis Rübsaamen, 1915
Phegomyia Kieffer, 1913
Physemocecis Rübsaamen, 1914
Psectrosema Kieffer, 1904
Rabdophaga Westwood, 1847
Rhopalomyia Rübsaamen, 1892
Rondaniola Rübsaamen & Hedicke, 1938
Sackenomyia Felt, 1908
Schmidtiella Rübsaamen, 1914
Semudobia Kieffer, 1913
Spurgia Gagné, 1990
Taxomyia Rübsaamen, 1912
Trotteria Kieffer, 1901
Wachtliella Rübsaamen, 1915
Zygiobia Kieffer, 1913

References 

Cecidomyiinae
Supertribes